The 1840 United States presidential election in Georgia took place between October 30 and December 2, 1840, as part of the 1840 United States presidential election. Voters chose 11 representatives, or electors to the Electoral College, who voted for President and Vice President.

Georgia voted for the Whig candidate, William Henry Harrison, over Democratic candidate Martin Van Buren. Harrison won Georgia by a margin of 11.56%.

Results

References

Georgia
1840
1840 Georgia (U.S. state) elections